Rebecca McGowan (born 27 May 2000) is a British taekwondo practitioner. She won one of the bronze medals in the women's middleweight event at the 2022 World Taekwondo Championships held in Guadalajara, Mexico. She won the gold medal in the women's 73 kg event at the 2021 European Taekwondo Championships held in Sofia, Bulgaria. She also won one of the bronze medals in her event at the 2022 European Taekwondo Championships held in Manchester, United Kingdom.

In 2019, she competed in the women's middleweight event at the World Taekwondo Championships held in Manchester, United Kingdom.

References

External links 
 

Living people
2000 births
Scottish female taekwondo practitioners
European Taekwondo Championships medalists
World Taekwondo Championships medalists
Sportspeople from Dumbarton
People educated at Our Lady & St Patrick's High School
21st-century British women